Alec Glen was a Scottish amateur football left half who played in the Scottish League for Ayr United, Queen's Park and Dundee. He was capped by Scotland at amateur level.

References

Scottish footballers
Scottish Football League players
Queen's Park F.C. players
Association football wing halves
Scotland amateur international footballers
Year of birth missing
Place of birth missing
Dundee F.C. players
Ayr United F.C. players
Kello Rovers F.C. players